The 1910 British Lions tour to Argentina was a rugby tour of Argentina made by a side made up of 16 English players and 3 Scots. The organisers of the tour named the team the "English Rugby Union team", but the host country advertised the touring team as the British Combined ("Combinado Británico" in Spanish). The 1910 team has been termed as one of the three "lost lions" tours, and is detailed on the British and Irish Lions official website. For Argentina, this tour marked the start of international rugby union and the test against the Combined British on 12 June 1910 was the first test in the Argentine national team's history.

History

In 1910, a British side toured South Africa for the fourth time, being the eighth outing of a British touring side at this point. The South African tour was, however, the first official tour, in that it had the official sanction of the four home unions. Concurrently, RV Stanley, more famously known as Major Stanley of Oxford, later an England selector, organised a side to tour Argentina. John Raphael, the England fullback, was selected as the captain of this team, branded by Stanley as the England Rugby Union team. The hosts referred to the team as the Combined British, perhaps more appropriate given the squad included three Scots.

The tour was also part of the celebrations for the 100th anniversary of the May Revolution. The people of Argentina termed it the "Combined British", also known as "Great Britain XV". Argentina made its international debut against this team under the name "The River Plate Rugby Football Union" on 12 June. The match was played at Sociedad Sportiva Argentina of Palermo and Argentina lost 28–3. The only try for the Argentine squad (the first international try) was scored by Buenos Aires F.C. player Frank Heriot. . Argentina's most notable players were captain Oswald St. John Gebbie and Barry Heatlie, a South African who played for the Springboks.

The Combined British played six matches, winning them all, including a victory over Argentina in their first ever test on 12 June 1910.

Team
Of those representing the Combined British, only four had played international rugby previously. They were:
John Raphael, (Old Merchants Taylors', Oxford University, Surrey) played fullback for England (also a notable cricketer); 
Alexander Palmer, (London Hospital, Harlequins) a New Zealander who played on the wing for England
Barrie Bennetts, (Penzance RFC and Cornwall) played on the wing for England
Anthony Henniker-Gotley, (Oxford University, Kent, Blackheath) played at halfback for England

Other members of the team were:

 Harold Gordon Monks (Liverpool Old Boys, Wigan RFC and Lancashire)
 Horace Evelyn Ward (Harlequins and Middlesex)
 E.S. Holmwood (Kent)
 William Lovat Fraser (Merchistonian FC)
 Edward Newman Fuller (Old Merchants Taylors', Cambridge University and Kent)
 John Francis Ashby (Cheshire)
 Robert Bertram Waddell (Glasgow Academicals RFC)
 Henry John Fraser
 Walter Legh Huntingford (United Services, Blackheath and Surrey)
 Robin Harrison (Northampton RFC, Midlands RFU and the South)
 Whalley Stranach (Guy's Hospital and Kent and English Trials)
 Stanley Herbert Smith (Cumberland)
 Martin Tweed (Guy's Hospital)
 Percy Robert Diggle (Oxford University and Cumberland)
 Peter Denny Strang (Old Merchants Taylors' and Surrey)
 SH Milnes
 Henry Whitehead (Manchester FC, Lancashire and North of England)

Match summary 
Complete list of matches played by the British Isles in Argentina:

 Test matches

Test details 

Argentina: : J.E. Saffery, Cornelius MacCarthy, Oswald Gebbie, M. Heriot, Henry Talbot, W.A. Watson, Carlos Mold, Barry Heatlie, L.H. Gribbell, W.H. Hayman, F. Henrys, A. Bovet, A. Donelly, Alvan Reid

Notes

References

British Lions tour of Argentina
British & Irish Lions tours
Rugby union tours of Argentina
Bri
Br
History of rugby union matches between Argentina and the British & Irish Lions